Sheffield Collegiate School began in 1836 in new buildings on the corner of Ecclesall Road and Collegiate Crescent (now Grade II listed and part of Sheffield Hallam University). The school enjoyed academic success but lacked sound finances and was taken over by Sheffield Grammar School in 1884, to become Sheffield Royal Grammar School (SRGS) in 1885.

In 1905 Sheffield City Council acquired both Wesley College and SRGS and they were merged on the site of the former to form King Edward VII School (KES), named after the reigning monarch.

Headmasters of Sheffield Collegiate School

Notable alumni of Sheffield Collegiate School 
 John Cordeaux (1831–1899) – ornithologist
 Nathaniel Creswick (1826–1917) – co-founder of Sheffield F.C. and the Sheffield Rules
 Henry Jackson (1839–1921) – Regius Professor of Greek at the University of Cambridge 
 George Rolleston (1829–1881) – Linacre Professor of Anatomy and Physiology at the University of Oxford
 Henry Clifton Sorby (1826–1908) – scientist, microscopist

Notable staff of Sheffield Collegiate School 
 Alfred Ainger (1837–1904) – English divine and man of letters, assistant master 1864–66
 Richard Deodatus Poulett-Harris – Second Master at Collegiate School (1843), then Rector of Hobart Town High School in Tasmania
 Charles Warren (1843–1919) – clergyman, cricketer, Vice-Principal from 1868 to 1869

References

 Cornwell, John (2005). King Ted's (1st ed.). King Edward VII School, Sheffield. . (This book reviews the period from 1604 to 1905, although its bulk is concerned with 1905–2005.)

External links
King Edward VII School and Language College
Old Edwardians – site for alumni association + archive material
Sheffield Collegiate School – Sheffield Collegiate School history on Sheffield Collegiate Cricket Club's site

Defunct schools in Sheffield
Grade II listed buildings in Sheffield
 
Educational institutions established in 1836
1836 establishments in England
Educational institutions disestablished in 1884
School buildings completed in 1836